Le Chef-d’œuvre inconnu (English The Unknown Masterpiece) is a short story by Honoré de Balzac. It was first published in the newspaper L'Artiste with the title Maître Frenhofer (English: Master Frenhofer) in August 1831. It appeared again later in the same year under the title Catherine Lescault, conte fantastique.  It was published in Balzac's  Études philosophiques in 1837 and was integrated into La Comédie humaine in 1846. The work is separated into two chapters: Gillette and Catherine Lescault. 

Le Chef-d’œuvre inconnu is a reflection on art, and has had an important influence on modernist artists.

Plot summary
Young Nicolas Poussin, as yet unknown, visits the painter Porbus in his workshop.  He is accompanied by the old master Frenhofer, who comments expertly on the large tableau that Porbus has just finished. The painting is of Mary of Egypt, and while Frenhofer sings her praises, he hints that the work seems unfinished.  With some slight touches of the paintbrush, Frenhofer transforms Porbus' painting such that Mary the Egyptian appears to come alive before their very eyes.  Although Frenhofer has mastered his technique, he admits that he has been unable to find a suitable model for his own masterpiece, which depicts a beautiful courtesan called Catherine Lescault, known as La Belle noiseuse. He has been working on this future masterpiece that no one has yet seen for ten years. Poussin offers his own lover, Gillette, as a model. Gillette is so beautiful that Frenhofer is inspired to finish his project quickly. Poussin and Porbus come to admire the painting, but all they can see is part of a foot that has been lost in a swirl of colors. Their disappointment drives Frenhofer to madness, and he burns his paintings and dies that night.

Historical background
Unlike most other stories in La Comédie humaine, this is set in the 17th century, in the year 1612. Of the three artists depicted in this story, Poussin and Porbus were real artists of the 17th century. Frenhofer is a purely fictional character. In the case of Porbus, Balzac used the gallicized version of the surname of Frans Pourbus.

Influence on artists

Paul Cézanne strongly identified with Frenhofer, once saying "Frenhofer, c’est moi" (I am Frenhofer). Critic Jon Kear argues that Cézanne's own attempts to paint the nude were heavily influenced by Balzac's portrayal of Frenhofer's work.

In 1927, Ambroise Vollard asked Picasso to illustrate Le Chef-d’œuvre inconnu. Picasso was fascinated by the text and identified with Frenhofer so much that he moved to the rue des Grands-Augustins in Paris where Balzac located Porbus' studio. There he painted his own masterpiece, Guernica. Picasso lived here during World War II.

Adaptations
Sidney Peterson's 1949 avant-garde film Mr Frenhofer and the Minotaur was based on the link between the short story and the work of Picasso. It draws on Picasso's Minotauromachy, bringing Picasso's work to life with the characters of Gillette, Poussin and Porbus participating.

"Le Chef-d’œuvre inconnu" inspired the film La Belle Noiseuse by Jacques Rivette (1991).

References

External links
"The Unknown Masterpiece", translation (by Ellen Marriage?) at Project Gutenberg (full text)
"The Hidden Masterpiece", translation by Katharine Prescott Wormeley at Project Gutenberg (full text)
Nicolas Poussin paintings
 Le Chef-d'œuvre inconnu, audio version
Picasso's Illustrations for Le Chef-d'œuvre inconnu

1831 short stories
French short stories
Books of La Comédie humaine
Works originally published in L'Artiste
Short stories adapted into films
Short stories by Honoré de Balzac
Fiction set in 1612